The Llangollen International Musical Eisteddfod is a music festival which takes place every year during the second week of July in Llangollen, North Wales. It is one of several large annual Eisteddfodau in Wales. Singers and dancers from around the world are invited to take part in over 20 competitions followed each evening by concerts on the main stage. Over five thousand singers, dancers and instrumentalists from around 50 countries perform to audiences of more than 50,000 over the 6 days of the event.

Famous performers at Llangollen have included Luciano Pavarotti (who first competed in Llangollen in 1955 with his father and a choir from their home town Modena, and for whom the Eisteddfod's principal trophy – the Choir of the World Pavarotti Trophy – is named), Red Army Ensemble, Julian Lloyd Webber and Ladysmith Black Mambazo. The final Sunday Evening Gala Concert has featured Katherine Jenkins, Bryn Terfel, Kiri Te Kanawa, James Galway and Montserrat Caballe.

Origins

The origins of the International Eisteddfod go back to 1943 when Harold Tudor, an officer of the British Council, arranged a visit for members of governments-in-exile to the Welsh National Eisteddfod in Bangor. The excursion was well received especially by the noted writer and poet Juraj Slavik, the Minister for the Interior in the Czechoslovakia Government in Exile. Following the visit he wrote to Tudor praising the value of music as a way of healing the effects of War. The following year an international concert was held as part of the Llandybie National Eisteddfod.

Towards the end of 1945 Tudor proposed that an international choral festival be added to the 1947 Welsh National Eisteddfod, however the Council of the National Eisteddfod felt that as all their effort were involved in rebuilding their own organisation they could not take on such a scheme. Tudor modified his proposal into an independent music festival and found support for this idea from W. S. Gwynn Williams, Welsh composer and music publisher and George Northing, a teacher from Ysgol Dinas Brân and chairman of Llangollen town council. Gwynn Williams and Northing both pressed for the Eisteddfod to be in their home town of Llangollen.

The public gave support to this idea at two public meetings in May 1946 but concerns were also raised about who would come, where the event would be held and how the event would be financed.
The British Council offered to help find choirs from Europe and to give financial support however the town decided to raise the money through a public subscription and quickly gathered over £1100.
George Northing was made director of the executive board; Gwynn Williams became music director; Harold Tudor was Director of Publicity and W. Clayton Russon, a local businessman and High Sheriff of Merionethshire became President.

Plans to hold the event on the school field of Dinas Bran County School progressed throughout 1946-47. Accommodation for the overseas competitors would be in houses in the town and surrounding area and domestic participants would be given beds in church and school halls. As rationing was still in place ration coupons had to be found for all the visitors and the Minister of Food was eventually persuaded to supply these.

When in June 1947 it was time for competitors to travel to Llangollen a railway strike had started in France and there were serious doubt as to whether any overseas competitors would be able to arrive. Considerable relief was felt by the organisers when the first coach of competitors arrived bringing the ladies’ choir Grupo Musical Feminino from Oporto. They were the eventual winners of the Ladies Competition whilst the Men's competition was won by the Hungarian workers’ choir, who had completed their journey to Wales by hitch-hiking when their train had been cancelled at Basle because of the French strike.

The Esperanto Society played a significant part in the first year when it was felt that there could be a shortage of participants. Reto Rossetti, a well-known figure and author in the Esperanto movement, was asked to help and through publicity in Esperanto magazines and to the surprised of the organisers, several groups contacted the Eisteddfod committee. Two troupes of Spanish dancers, on a tour of Britain sponsored by the British Council and the Esperanto Society, arrived and despite there not being a dance competition in the first year, performed to delighted audiences. Folk dance competitions have featured in every subsequent Llangollen Eisteddfod.The eisteddfod was brought to close by what has now become the traditional Sunday concert featuring Sir John Barbirolli and the Hallé Orchestra. The 1947 International Eisteddfod was hailed as an unqualified success with praise for the organisers, the founders, and all the competitors. There was even a surplus of £1,432 to be used for the next year's event.

A major test mission to promote reconciliation occurred in 1949, just four years after the end of the war, when a choir from Lübeck came to compete at the Eisteddfod. There had been Austrian and Italian choirs, but they hardly counted; neither did Spaniards.  As the choir tell it in a letter now in the Clwyd archive in Ruthin, there was a tearful welcome with tea and sandwiches when the choir arrived at the Llangollen station from the eisteddfod helpers and the townspeople. Later, the festival's compère Mr Hywel Roberts introduced the choir with the words:  "Ladies and gentlemen, please welcome our friends from Germany."  The town organised a concert to help the choir raise funds, and (in 2015) members of the choir still correspond with Llangollen friends.

The Welsh motto of the International Eisteddfod, "Byd gwyn fydd byd a gano. Gwaraidd fydd ei gerddi fo," was composed by the poet T. Gwynn Jones and appears on the Eisteddfod trophies. It is usually translated as, "Blessed is a world that sings, Gentle are its songs."

Recent years

The 2007 Eisteddfod included performances by José Carreras, Joan Baez, and Hayley Westenra. In 2008, there were performances by Elaine Paige, All Angels, and Alfie Boe; in 2009, performances by Barbara Dickson, Sir Willard White, Blake, and Natasha Marsh, with a James Bond 007 spectacular, featuring the Orchestra of Welsh National Opera, as the Sunday finale; 2010 saw performances by Katherine Jenkins and Nigel Kennedy. In 2011 there were concerts featuring Lulu, Russell Watson, Faryl Smith, Ruthie Henshaw and McFly.

In 2012 the Eisteddfod played host to Lesley Garrett, Alison Balsom, Nicola Benedettii and Sian Edwards in a celebration concert for the Queen's Diamond Jubilee. There were also appearances by Alfie Boe, Steffan Morris, and Valentina Nafornta, and a performance of Karl Jenkins's new work "The Peacemakers" by a specially formed massed choir accompanied by the Llangollen International Eisteddfod Orchestra. The week was rounded off by the Grand Finale Concert, featuring Fflur Wyn, Wynne Evans, Mark Llewelyn Evans, John Owen-Jones and Richard Balcombe.

In recent years the Sunday evening concert has been given over to more "popular" music. Starting with McFly in 2011, subsequent concerts have included UB40, Status Quo (band), and Manic Street Preachers.

Parade
A parade is usually held on the Tuesday of the Eisteddfod week, in which both the locals and visitors, take part dancing, singing, and playing musical instruments, whilst marching the streets of Llangollen. However, in 2016 the parade was moved to the Friday to enable more competitors to take part.

See also
 List of music festivals in the United Kingdom

References

External links
 International Eisteddfod Official Site

Eisteddfod
Music festivals in Wales
Tourist attractions in Denbighshire
Llangollen
Cultural festivals in the United Kingdom
International cultural organizations
Recurring events established in 1947
Celtic music festivals
Music festivals established in 1947
Summer events in Wales